The Shanghai Jiao Tong University School of Medicine (SJTUSM), formerly Shanghai Second Medical University, is a public medical school in Shanghai, China. Clinical medicine of SJTUSM is consistently ranked first among medical schools nationally and #62 by the U.S. News & World Report globally. The "Clinical and health" discipline of SJTU also ranked #53 globally by Times Higher Education World University Rankings as of 2022. Its "Pharmacy & Pharmaceutical Sciences" and "Public Health" were ranked 35th and 76th in the world respectively by the Academic Ranking of World Universities.

It is one of the two medical schools that received the highest ranking of "A+" in Clinical Medicine from the Ministry of Education of the People's Republic of China. In the 2nd, 3rd, and 4th round of evaluating disciplines in degree and graduate programs organized by the Ministry of Education from 2009 to 2018, and the comprehensive strength of various disciplines belonged to the first echelon of the nation's medical schools.

History
Shanghai Second Medical College was established in 1952 and was renamed Shanghai Second Medical University in 1985. It was composed of the medical schools of Aurora University and St. John's University and Tong De Medical College. It was a municipal university before 2005.

In July 2005, under an agreement signed by Shanghai Municipal Government and the Ministry of Education, Shanghai Jiao Tong University and Shanghai Second Medical University were merged into one. The new university is administered by both the Shanghai Municipal Government and the Ministry of Education.

In November, 2010, SJTUSM became one of the first ten universities jointly supported by the Ministry of Health and the Ministry of Education. The rich historic background of over one hundred years and heroic journey of more than 50 years have eventually brought about a research-oriented medical school with all-round development in medical education, clinical services, and scientific research, as well as other social services, a medical school with outstanding features and distinct advantages, a strong faculty, and remarkable academic achievements. In the second round of evaluating disciplines in degree and graduate programs organized by the Ministry of Education in 2009, clinical medicine of SJTUSM ranked first nationally, and the comprehensive strength of various disciplines belonged to the first echelon of the nation's medical schools.

List of presidents
Gong Naiquan (1952.10 - 1953.12)
Sun Zhongde (1953.12 - 1958.2)
Guan Zizhan (1958.2 - 1966)
Lan Xichun (1978.8 - 1984.3)
Wang Zhenyi (王振义) (1984.3 - 1988. 1)
Wang Yifei (1988.1 - 1997.7)
Fan Guanrong (1997.7 - 2003.3)
Shen Xiaoming (沈晓明)2003.3 - 2006.3)
Zhu Zhenggang (2006.3-2010.12)
Chen Guoqiang (2010.12- present)

Affiliated hospitals 
 Ruijin Hospital
 Renji Hospital
 Xinhua Hospital
 Shanghai General Hospital (Shanghai First People's Hospital)
 Shanghai Third People's Hospital
 Shanghai Sixth People's Hospital
 Shanghai Ninth People's Hospital
 Shanghai Chest Hospital
 Shanghai Mental Health Center
 Shanghai Children's Medical Center
 Shanghai Children's Hospital
 International Peace Maternity and Child Health Hospital, also of China Welfare Institute
 Shanghai Tongren Hospital

References

External links 
 Shanghai Jiao Tong University School of Medicine 
 Overview of Shanghai Jiao Tong University School of Medicine 
 Overview of Shanghai Jiao Tong University 

Medical schools in China
Shanghai Jiao Tong University
Educational institutions established in 1952
1952 establishments in China